Ni Wei-tou (born 1944 in Zhenhai, Ningbo, Zhejiang) is a Taiwanese physicist, who graduated from the Department of Physics of National Taiwan University (NTU), and got his PhD of Physics & Mathematics from California Institute of Technology. After his retirement on 1 October 2000, he is now appointed as a professor emeritus of the Department of Physics of National Tsing Hua University (NTHU) at Hsinchu, Taiwan, since 2006.

He is an expert of theoretical and experimental gravitational physics, astrophysics, cosmology, particle physics, and quantum optics etc. He is famous for his alternative theories of gravitation to general relativity, such as Ni (1972), Ni (1973), and Lee, Lightman & Ni (1974). He has been devoted to popular science in Taiwan.

Books

 2017 One Hundred Years of General Relativity: From Genesis and Empirical Foundations to Gravitational Waves, Cosmology and Quantum Gravity (The 2 Volumes)

References

External links 
 Prof. Ni Wei-Tou's intro page at NTHU (in Chinese)

1944 births
Living people
National Taiwan University alumni
Relativity theorists
20th-century Taiwanese physicists
Academic staff of the National Tsing Hua University
21st-century Taiwanese physicists
Writers from Ningbo
Scientists from Ningbo
Taiwanese people from Zhejiang